Plaza Hidalgo is an urban plaza in colonia 5 de Diciembre, in Puerto Vallarta, in the Mexican state of Jalisco. Neighboring the Parroquia Nuestra Señora del Refugio, the plaza is named after Miguel Hidalgo y Costilla, leader of the Mexican War of Independence. Also, there is a statue that honors Hidalgo. Underground, there is a public parking lot.

History

During the COVID-19 pandemic in Mexico, the plaza was temporarily closed. The government of Puerto Vallarta later allowed market vendors to move there after Cuale River flooded their workplace when Hurricane Nora hit in 2021.

Public art
The plaza features a bronze statue of Miguel Hidalgo y Costilla by José Esteban Ramírez Guareño. It was installed in 1988 and it replaced the idea of placing the same model in concrete.

References

External links

 

Plazas in Jalisco
Puerto Vallarta